Bambai Main Ka Ba is a Bhojpuri song written by Dr Sagar and sung by Manoj Bajpayee. The video of the song is directed by Anubhav Sinha and the music is produced by Prasanna Suresh & Anurag Saikia. This song features Manoj Bajpayee, while he describes about the Mumbai city with a emotional rap song.

Cast
 Manoj Bajpayee

Music video
The music video titled "Bambai Main Ka Ba" was released by T-Series on YouTube on 9 September 2020. This is the debut music video of actor Manoj Bajpayee.

Reception 
The song has 8.9 million views on YouTube since its release.

Personnel

 Song : Bambai Main Ka Ba
 Artist : Manoj Bajpayee
 Starring : Manoj Bajpayee
 Lyrics and Composition: Dr Sagar
 Music : Anurag Saikia
 Mixing and Mastering : Bhaskar Sarma Euphony Studio
 Video Director : Anubhav Sinha
 DOP : Soumik Mukherjee
 Label : T Series

References

External links 

 

2020 songs
Bhojpuri-language songs